The 1970 Chicago Bears season was their 51st regular season completed in the National Football League. The team finished with a 6–8 record, a significant improvement over the 1–13 record of the previous season, the worst in franchise history.

Offseason 
 June 16, 1970 – After a seven-month battle with cancer, running back Brian Piccolo died at age 26.

NFL Draft

Roster

Regular season 
As an experiment, the Bears hosted their first home game of the season at Northwestern University's Dyche Stadium in Evanston. The Bears' Wrigley Field landlord, the Chicago Cubs, were in a pennant race and might play in the National League Championship Series and World Series, and that Wrigley Field would be unavailable (at least for installation of temporary seating in right and center field) until well into October. (The Cubs were in contention in the National League East until the final week of the 1970 season, thus rendering the anticipation moot.)

In addition, the NFL was pressuring the Bears to move out of Wrigley Field, because it had no lights and its seating capacity was under 50,000 (even with additional seating in right field for football games), stipulations of the AFL–NFL merger agreement. The Bears planned to move to Evanston for the 1971 season, but Evanston residents petitioned city officials to block the move, and the Big Ten Conference ultimately barred the Bears from using Dyche Stadium; the Bears moved to Chicago's Soldier Field.

Schedule

Season summary

Week 1 at Giants

Week 2

Week 3

Week 4

Week 5

Week 6

Week 7

Week 8

Week 9

Week 10

Week 11

Week 12

Week 13 

 Source: Pro-Football-Reference.com

Week 14 

    
    
    
    
    

 Jack Concannon 26/50, 280 Yds
 Dick Gordon 9 Rec, 119 Yds

Standings

References 

Chicago Bears
Chicago Bears seasons
Chicago Bears